The , signed as Route 4 is one of the radial routes of the Shuto Expressway system in the Tokyo area. Route 4 runs west from Miyakezaka Junction (with the Inner Circular Route) in Chiyoda-ku and runs for 8.44 miles (13.5 km) through Shinjuku-ku, Shibuya-ku, and Suginami-ku. The Route 4 designation ends at the Takaido Interchange and the expressway continues as the intercity Chūō Expressway to Nagoya via Yamanashi and Nagano Prefecture.

History
August 2, 1964 -  Miyakezaka Junction - Hatsudai Temporary Exit section opened
August 15, 1973 - Eifuku Exit - Takaido Interchange section opened
September 27, 1973 - Hatsudai Exit - Eihuku Exit section opened
May 18, 1976 - Completing the entire route.

Exit list

04
1964 establishments in Japan
Roads in Tokyo